Saint Folquin, properly Saint-Folquin, is a commune in France.

Saint Folquin may also refer to:

 Folquin ( 14 December 855 at Esquelbeques), its eponymous saint
 St Folquin's, the parish church of St-Folquin